Leandro Assumpção da Silva (born February 3, 1986) is a Brazilian footballer who plays for Muangkan United in Thai League 2. He started playing football in Thailand with Chiangrai United in 2011. After playing for many clubs, he became the eighth footballer who scored more than 100 goals in Thai League 1 in July 2019.

Honours

Club
Muangthong United
 Thai League Cup (1): 2017
 Mekong Club Championship (1): 2017

References

External links
 

 Leandro Assumpção Interview

1986 births
Living people
Brazilian footballers
Brazilian expatriate footballers
Brazilian expatriate sportspeople in Thailand
Expatriate footballers in Thailand
Leandro Assumpcao
Madureira Esporte Clube players
CR Flamengo footballers
Bangu Atlético Clube players
Olaria Atlético Clube players
Vila Nova Futebol Clube players
Associação Desportiva Cabofriense players
Leandro Assumpcao
Leandro Assumpcao
Leandro Assumpcao
Association football wingers
Association football forwards
Leandro Assumpcao